Cellestine "Sally" Hannemann (March 28, 1924- January 26, 2018) was an American author and pioneering figure in the methodology of Oshibana art. Hannemann, née Hofmann, born in Chicago, Illinois, lived in the San Fernando Valley of Southern California. She was best known for developing new processes in the pressing of botanical materials to reduce discoloration and shrinkage. She manufactured a unique press incorporating polyester materials to cushion the plants that became known as "Cellestine's Press," and authored a book that is a popular reference guide for plant pressers and Oshibana artists. Hannemann also wrote two novels.

Invention and publication
In the 1970s, Hannemann designed a unique spring-loaded press to preserve and gently but expertly press flowers. This press was a major advancement over traditional pressing methods that had been practiced since the Victorian era of flower pressing. She followed with publication of a guide book, Glorious Pressed Flower Projects, in 1991 that shared her technical expertise. This book is used as a source book on the art of pressed flowers.  Hannemann has influenced the work of other pressers who employ her specific techniques for botanical preservation and application that are described in her book. In 1996, "Handcraft Illustrated" quarterly published an article with Hannemann's instructions for making this cushioned and padded press and included tips for creating pressed materials for Oshibana works of art.

Recognition
Dedication to Cellestine Hanneman,  Exhibition Catalog, 2014.
Best in Show Award named the Cellestine Hannemann Award, World Wide Pressed Flower Guild Exhibition, Guangzhou, China, 2010

Affiliation 
Member, World Wide Pressed Flower Guild

Selected works 

 .

References

1924 births
20th-century American writers
2018 deaths
21st-century American writers
20th-century American women writers
21st-century American women writers